Jałowiec  is a village in the administrative district of Gmina Lubań, within Lubań County, Lower Silesian Voivodeship, in south-western Poland. Prior to 1945 it was in Germany (Lower Silesia) and had the name Wingendorf.

The National Heritage Board of Poland (Narodowy Instytut Dziedzictwa) has put the Protestant church of 1799 and the palace and park of Jałowiec on its monument list.

References

Villages in Lubań County